The oxygenation index is a calculation used in intensive care medicine to measure the fraction of inspired oxygen (FiO2) and its usage within the body.

A lower oxygenation index is better - this can be inferred by the equation itself.  As the oxygenation of a person improves, they will be able to achieve a higher PaO2 at a lower FiO2.  This would be reflected on the formula as a decrease in the numerator or an increase in the denominator - thus lowering the OI.  Typically an OI threshold is set for when a neonate should be placed on ECMO, for example >40.

Equation 

 : Fraction of inspired oxygen, in percent;
 : Mean airway pressure, in mmHg;
 : Partial pressure of oxygen in arterial blood, in mmHg.

References 

Respiration